Highland School District may refer to:

 Highland School District (Arkansas) - Highland, Arkansas
 Highland School District (Washington) 
 Highland School District (Wisconsin) - Highland, Wisconsin
 Highland Community School District - Washington County, Iowa
 Highland Community Unit School District 5 - Highland, Illinois
 Highland Independent School District - Nolan County, Texas
 Highland Local School District - Medina County, Ohio